Natalie Davis (a.k.a. "The Miniature Serial Killer") is a fictional character on the CBS crime drama CSI: Crime Scene Investigation, portrayed by Jessica Collins.

The Miniature Killer was introduced in the seventh-season premiere; after a season-long arc, she was identified as Natalie Davis in the finale. She made a one-time reappearance in season nine.

Modus operandi
The key signature of the Miniature Killer's crimes were meticulous scale models built to represent each crime scene. The models were inspired by the work of Frances Glessner Lee, who constructed the actual Nutshell Studies of Unexplained Death as a way to train homicide investigators.

The Miniature Killer's models were either left at the murder site or delivered to someone involved in solving the case. Every detail was accurate, and even used the victim's blood instead of paint. Every model also contained a hidden picture of a bloodied doll and an item somehow related to bleach. Her victims were killed in widely different manners, including bludgeoning, poisoning, and electrocution. Many of her victims had employed her services as a cleaning lady, and several also had connections to her foster father.

Concept and creation
The Miniature Killer's modus operandi is inspired by the Nutshell Studies of Unexplained Death, a series of intricate crime-scene dioramas that are actually used to help train the Baltimore Homicide Investigation unit. These dollhouses are explored in detail in the documentary Of Dolls and Murder.

Natalie's background
Natalie Davis is the elder daughter of Christopher Davis, a talented ventriloquist who billed himself as "The Great Rainone".  Natalie had a younger sister named Chloe.  Natalie was jealous of the attention Chloe received from their father, but the two sisters got along reasonably well until their mother died. Soon after, in 1981, Natalie's jealousy drove her over the edge, and she pushed Chloe out of a treehouse to her death. This was the first of her series of murders and the only one that she did not re-create in miniature. When Natalie looked down from the treehouse at Chloe lying dead, the scene looked like a miniature, and Natalie became obsessed with creating miniatures of her subsequent victims and crime scenes. She later would witness her father cleaning up Chloe's blood with bleach, and bleach would become a psychotic trigger for her killings.

Devastated by the loss of Chloe, Davis eventually could not handle caring for Natalie, and put her up for adoption.  After going through a string of foster homes, Natalie finally was taken in permanently by Ernie Dell.  Dell and Natalie established a strong bond, and he became the first person she really loved. Dell was a model train enthusiast who unwittingly helped her build her first three miniatures. When Dell discovers what the miniatures are being used for, he forgives her and rationalizes her actions. In order to protect her, Dell falsely confessed to being the Miniature Killer, and committed suicide on a live video feed that went directly to Gil Grissom.  Natalie was devastated by Dell's death and held Grissom responsible. When she discovers his relationship with Sara Sidle, she decides to get revenge by abducting her.

Known victims

Chloe Davis
Natalie's younger sister (age 4), pushed to her death from a treehouse.

Izzy Delancy
Grissom and his team found the washed-up rock star dead in his kitchen in the episode "Built to Kill, Part 2". His body was sprawled in a chair and leaning forwards onto the table. The CSIs determined that the cause of death was a single blow delivered to the back of a head with a rolling pin. The first miniature is found close by. It is a perfect diorama of the kitchen. It includes objects in the garbage can and the placement of Delancy's blood. In the model, they also find a picture of a bloodied doll, hidden behind a mini photo frame, and a bleach container in the miniature garbage.

Trigger: On August 25, 2006, Izzy Delancy left a voicemail on Ernie's answering machine, which was also being used by Natalie. Delancy reminded her to use bleach to get the stains out of his sweats. This was most likely the trigger that led to Delancy's murder.

Connections: Delancy sent out a public service announcement (PSA) for animal cruelty against the chicken plant where Ernie Dell (Natalie's foster father)—as well as Raymundo Suarez (Natalie's third miniatures victim)—worked. Natalie worked as a housecleaner for Izzy Delancy.

Penny Garden

In "Post Mortem", an elderly woman  Penny Garden was found dead, lying through her living room window. It was revealed that she was dying from cancer and was heavily medicated. Her medication was not found at the scene, leading Grissom's team to assume that stealing the medication was the motive of the murder. This led to the suspicion that Penny's reformed-junkie of a nephew was the murderer. However, this theory is put aside when the nephew brings forward a miniature model depicting the murder scene, which was apparently delivered shortly after the CSIs left the scene.

After Penny's autopsy revealed that she had ingested a lethal amount of liquid nicotine, Grissom and his team note that there are traces of glue on the model of Penny's back and on the chair that she had been sitting in. This led them to believe that the killer had assumed that Penny would have died in her chair from her poisoned cherry brandy, not expecting her to go into convulsions. As Penny stood up in her spastic fits, the killer revealed herself, previously hiding behind Penny, and threw Penny through the window. With the miniature already made to depict Penny dead in her chair, the killer showed signs of obsessive habits, having to fix the model by rearranging it to match the actual death scene before it could be seen by anybody else. This explains why the miniature is not at the scene of death as the first one had been. A camera from Penny Garden's neighborhood showed Ernie Dell (Natalie's foster father) delivering the miniature wearing a jacket with a train symbol on the back.

While examining the model further, Grissom finds a second picture of the bloodied doll, again hidden. In a later episode of CSI, the model is connected to the others by the clue involving bleach; a coupon for bleach was found on the floor of the miniature.

Trigger: On October 18, 2006, Penny Garden left a voice message on the killer's answering machine. In the message, Garden informed the killer that she was firing her for not bleaching the grout as she had ordered. This order was most likely the trigger that led to Garden's murder.  In the background, one can hear the song ("Lollipop Lollipop" by The Chordettes) Penny listened to before she died, and the sound of her pouring a drink.

Connections: Penny Garden was a member of the same train miniatures club as Ernie Dell and was also connected to Lionel Dell (Ernie Dell's biological son) through her neighbor, who sold Penny Garden's medication to Lionel to get cash for Penny.

Raymundo Suarez

In "Loco Motives", Grissom and his team were brought to the scene of the murder of a janitor who was found lying face-first in a basin of shallow water at a chicken processing plant. The basin, the CSIs learned, was a stun bath, used to paralyze chickens before killing them by putting an electric current through the water. When Raymundo landed in the water, he became paralyzed long enough to drown.

A miniature of the stun room is found nearby, depicting Raymundo in his death position, lying face-first in the stun bath. After researching the chicken plant, the team learned that Izzy Delancy, mentioned above, had protested with a public service announcement (PSA) against the plant as part of his 'new leaf' act. While examining the model further, Grissom finds a third picture of the bloodied doll, again hidden. After cross-referencing the workers at the plant, the PSA, and the murders, Grissom's team found a prime suspect: Ernie Dell.

The team soon learned that he was part of the same train club as Penny Garden, linking him to all three murders. When they search his home, they find an elaborate workshop for building miniature models, including a train setup depicting a scene of death and morbid destruction. As a SWAT team burst into Ernie's home, Grissom received a live video feed from Ernie. Ernie confesses to the murders before shooting himself in the head.

Later in the series, in the episode "Lab Rats", the model is connected to the others by the clue involving bleach; a barrel of bleach is found near the stun bath.

Trigger: Natalie stated, when being asked if Raymundo touched her, that he had, but she was most likely set off by the smell of bleach she said was on his hands.

Connections: Raymundo worked at Mannleigh Chickens, the plant where Ernie Dell worked.

Officer Kamen/Barbara Tallman
The episode "Monster in the Box" begins with Grissom returning from a four-week sabbatical. As he opens a package delivered to his office, he is shocked to find another miniature. Calling the team in immediately, he realizes from a predated newspaper in the model that the murder has yet to happen. On the cover of the mini newspaper is a fourth image of the bloodied doll. In the miniature, a Caucasian woman is seen lying on her back on her couch, with a pillow. On the pillow are traces of her makeup, leading the CSIs to assume that she will be smothered to death with it.

After a large hunt for buildings with similar features displayed on the model, they find an apartment building that matches. Rushing to the penthouse, they arrive in time to startle Barbara Tallman, a retired psychotherapist who was about to lie down for her daily nap, along with her cat. Warning her of her impending death, the team swaps Tallman with a decoy, an officer named Kamen.

Waiting and watching, the team hopes to catch the killer, whom they assumed would enter the suite to suffocate Kamen. When nobody but Barbara's brother arrives, they decide to call off the stakeout. As they go to awake Kamen, however, they are horrified to find her dead. An autopsy of both the miniature Barbara, as well as Officer Kamen, later reveals that the cause of death is carbon monoxide poisoning. Examining the suite and the miniature, Grissom and his team find a mechanism in Barbara's chimney, timed in advance to drop a can of powdered charcoal onto the fire and seal off the chimney flue. The smoke from the lit fire and charcoal produced enough carbon monoxide to poison and suffocate anyone in the room. The murder proved that Ernie Dell was not the real Miniature Killer but had taken the blame (and the bullet) for someone else.

Looking over the model, Grissom finds three more images of the bloody doll, each from a previous crime. Putting them under an ultraviolet light, Grissom found a message scrawled across them: "YOU WERE WRONG".

Tallman was found dead in the same position the next morning, after refusing to have a guard spend the night. Her brother holds a press conference, bringing the knowledge of the Miniature Killer to the public. CSI later found his DNA from tears on his sister's body, revealing that he was part of an assisted suicide. Tallman had tried to frame the Miniature Killer for her suicide, an opportunity to stop her advancing Parkinson's disease.

Trigger: It is possible that the bleach used in the water in flower vases inside the apartment may have been the trigger, but it was not confirmed.

Connections: Tallman used to do volunteer work at the halfway house where Lionel Dell once resided.

Sara Sidle (survived)

In the seventh season's finale, "Living Doll", Natalie Davis is finally revealed as the Miniature Killer. The CSI team is able to narrow down their suspects to her and piece together her background before arresting her but not before she kidnaps Sara Sidle.

Natalie began her plot to capture Sara long before the event actually happened. She was a witness at a crime scene of a car wreck, where she saw Grissom gently stroke Sara's arm; it was then she decided to take her revenge on Grissom for Ernie Dell's death. She manages to buy the wrecked car and transport it to the desert. She then begins making a miniature depicting Sara trapped beneath the car. The model of Sara shows her with her arm sticking out from beneath the car, still moving (there is a motor attached to the arm that she had bought just days before the event).

Once finished, Natalie places the miniature in Grissom's office, a simple feat because she had been working at the CSI offices as a janitor.  Once the miniature is placed, she waits for Sara in the parking garage. When Sara arrives at her car, Natalie tases her, ties her up, and puts her in the trunk of her car before leaving the parking structure.

Sara wakes up and escapes her bindings before slipping into the back seat after removing the cushion. She attacks Natalie while she is driving, smashing Natalie's head through the driver's side window before jumping out of the slowing car. Winded, Sara is unable to move in time to escape from Natalie, who pulls up in the car, drugs Sara, and ties her up again.

In the season eight premiere episode, "Dead Doll" (part two to the seventh-season finale, "Living Doll"), Sara awakes to find her arm pinned under a red Mustang. Natalie leaves Sara to die as a severe rainstorm approaches, with warnings of flash floods in the area. As the water rises, Sara manages to escape by using the rearview mirror and is left with the task of surviving in the middle of the desert following the storm.

Trigger: She targeted Sara Sidle because she blamed Gil Grissom for taking her foster father Ernie Dell away from her, the person she loved the most. Natalie resolved to do the same to Grissom.

Connections: Natalie provided cleaning services at the CSI offices for a month before committing her crime; she was employed by a company that held the contracts for all municipal buildings in the Las Vegas strip area.

Previous suspects

Sven Delancy
The first person suspected to be the Miniature Killer was Sven Delancy, Izzy Delancy's son by his first wife.  Sven had been in therapy twice a week since he was six years old because of a rough life living between two households with a father he did not get along with and a "cokehead mother" as said by Izzy's current wife.  He first drew suspicion after his mother revealed he had an interest in architecture and that he could draw nearly perfect 3-D renderings of skyscrapers.

During interrogation, it was suggested that Sven had channeled his anger at his father through the miniature found at the crime scene.  When shown pictures of the miniature, however, the boy fainted at the sight of the real blood in the miniature.  To make sure that Sven was not pretending to be repulsed as he was by the sight of blood, a test was run on him, which involved artificially increasing the flow of adrenaline through his system to simulate his seeing blood.  Sven fainted once again, proving his innocence.  The crime lab was left with no more leads for some time afterwards.

Ernie Dell
Ernest Edward "Ernie" Dell became the prime suspect after he was linked to the first three murders through employment records and club memberships. Upon investigating Ernie's home, numerous models are found, making it clearer that he could be the Miniature Killer. Ernie was taken into custody but was released since there was not enough evidence to charge him. After being interrogated by the CSIs, Ernie leaves a message on the killer's answering machine, telling her that he saw her models and knew that she was the killer before stating that he was heading over to talk. After Ernie killed himself, the CSI team discovered that he had only been covering for someone else.

Lionel Dell/Mitchell Douglas
Searching through old videos, the team learned that Ernie had a son who'd changed his name from Lionel Dell to Mitchell Douglas. The CSIs assumed that he could be the killer. However, they soon learned that Ernie's son despised his father, and that Ernie seemed to love his adopted children more. Upon learning of his fostering of children, the CSIs learned from a video tape that Ernie had at least thirteen foster kids, any one of whom could be the Miniature Killer. The CSIs managed to slowly narrow down the list after tracking numerous of the Dell foster children down, some of whom had died over the years. After epithelials were discovered on a fingerprint of one of the miniature dolls made by the Miniature Killer, the CSI team learns that the killer is female, narrowing down the list of children further.

Grissom's involvement
Of all the CSIs, Gil Grissom has been the most involved with the case.  Grissom keeps each of the miniatures locked up in his office for observation.  Grissom also witnessed Ernie Dell's suicide, and was one of the first to pronounce the case closed. He is shocked when the next miniature is delivered directly to him.

In the episode "Lab Rats," Hodges mentioned to the other lab technicians that he heard Grissom was losing sleep over the case.  One of the techs, Wendy Simms, questioned Sara about this, and Sara's response was, "How would I know?" (In this episode it is Hodges who realizes the bleach connection between all four victims). At the end of "Leapin' Lizards", Grissom is seen assembling a miniature of his own, which appears to be of his own office. When asked by a concerned Catherine why he made it in "The Good, the Bad, and the Dominatrix", he replied that it was to keep his hands busy. It is later revealed that he was making it to connect to an online community that thrived on miniatures, where he could ask questions about custom-made items used in the killer's miniatures.

When the Miniature Killer was discovered to be Natalie Davis, Grissom was the first to talk to her in the interrogation room after Brass suggested dripping bleach on himself until she spoke. Grissom went in alone and attempted to get her to tell him where Sara was by complimenting her work and asking what she thought of his miniature. When Sara's name was brought up following her kidnapping, Natalie became very angry, to the point that she had a hallucination of her slitting Grissom's throat with a razor, while she was actually falling into an unresponsive state in which she sang  "I've Got a Pain in My Sawdust" to herself, leaving Sara's whereabouts unknown.

Upon learning from the weather forecast that three severe rainstorms were due to hit Las Vegas, Grissom simulated the effect the resulting flash floods would have on Sara's location by pouring water on the miniature of the crime scene. The water quickly pooled over the Sara doll, and its arm stopped moving.  After investigating numerous clues left behind, Grissom and the team located the car, only to find it buried deep in sand from the storm.  Sara's vest was found buried, but she had since escaped from the wreckage.  The team then scoured the desert to find her.  Nick was the first to find Sara, who had collapsed in the heat.  Though initially unresponsive, Sara regained consciousness as she was being MEDEVACed out, looking up at a relieved Grissom.

Natalie appeared in the season 9 episode, "Woulda, Coulda, Shoulda". Grissom attended her hearing, where it was decided that she was to be transferred to another jail, and to no longer receive therapy, as it was decided that therapeutic treatment had been successful. She expressed to Grissom the belief that she had changed and that she felt remorse for her actions, and that "people who do bad things need to be punished." After she is taken out, Grissom inspects a loose floor tile in her cell, lifting it up to find a miniature of Natalie hanging from the bottom by its neck, thus suggesting she still plans to hang herself, as per her original plan.

She is also shown working with bleach, as a way to conquer her fear of it and the psychotic impulses it brings out within her.

Appearances

Season 7
701. "Built to Kill, Part 1"
702. "Built to Kill, Part 2"
707. "Post Mortem"
710. "Loco Motives"
711. "Leaving Las Vegas"
716. "Monster in a Box"
720. "Lab Rats"
724. "Living Doll"

Season 8
801. "Dead Doll"

Season 9
907. "Woulda, Coulda, Shoulda"

Trivia
The picture of the doll hidden in each diorama is a representation of the doll that her father, the famous ventriloquist, made in the image of Natalie's dead younger sister.
A major part of the Miniature Killer story arc is the miniature crime scenes themselves. Crafted by set designer Rob Sissman, each crime scene was actually three separate creations. Sissman designed the life-size set and then created two miniature replicas. The prop that was used by the actors on the show was a half-inch-scale model of the original set. High-definition cameras were used to capture close shots of the third model, which was a one-inch scale. It took Sissman hours to duplicate the details for each scene and he said that the "season was exhausting."
The first letter of each method of killing spells bleach, which was the killer's trigger: 
(B)lunt Force Trauma
(L)iquid Nicotine poisoning
(E)lectrocution
(A)sphyxiation
(C)rushing
(H)anging – unclear if she actually followed through with this one.

References

External links

CSI: Crime Scene Investigation characters
Fictional janitors
Fictional serial killers
Television characters introduced in 2006
Fictional kidnappers